Sonia Samuels (born 16 May 1979) is a British long-distance runner. She competed in the marathon event at the 2013 World Championships in Athletics in Moscow, Russia. Samuels finished in seventh place at the 2017 Berlin Marathon with a time of 2:29:34.

References

External links

Power of 10 profile

1979 births
Living people
British female long-distance runners
British female marathon runners
English female long-distance runners
English female marathon runners
World Athletics Championships athletes for Great Britain
Place of birth missing (living people)
Athletes (track and field) at the 2016 Summer Olympics
Olympic athletes of Great Britain
Athletes (track and field) at the 2018 Commonwealth Games
Sportspeople from North Shields
Commonwealth Games competitors for England
21st-century British women